Harry Gottsacker (born July 28, 1999) is an American racing driver who currently competes for Bryan Herta Autosport in the TCR class of the Michelin Pilot Challenge.

Career

Early career
Gottsacker was introduced to motorsports through his grandfather, who brought him to drag racing events when Gottsacker was young. Gottsacker began racing himself through karting at age 13, competing in a wealth of SKUSA-sanctioned championships. At 14, he was selected to represent the United States at the KZ2 World Championship. Despite graduating from full-time karting at the end of 2017, Gottsacker continues to compete to maintain sharpness during the winter offseason.

Rallycross
For 2016, Gottsacker embarked upon a part-time campaign in the Global Rallycross Championship, driving in the GRC Lites class for PMG Rallysport. In his rookie season, he registered five starts and a best finish of 5th, at both the Fair Park and Marine Corps Air Station New River events. Gottsacker ended the season 13th in the points classification, level on points with teammate Parker Chase.

Sports car racing
Alongside his Rallycross debut, Gottsacker completed a half-season with Performance Motorsports Group in the Pirelli World Challenge for 2016. Driving a Ginetta G55 GT4, he finished a season-best fifth place at Laguna Seca, finishing 13th in the GTS classification. Gottsacker expanded his relationship with Ginetta the following season, joining the marque's Young Driver Development Program for 2017. The first class, which included Gottsacker and fellow American driver Parker Chase, made up the backbone of Century Motorsport's factory-backed Ginetta GT3 entry into the 2017 British GT Championship. Joining team boss Nathan Freke, Gottsacker would only compete in the first three rounds of the campaign, taking the Silver class victory in the opening round at Oulton Park. Shortly before the round at Snetterton, Chase and Gottsacker both withdrew from the program, citing a desire to pursue other motorsport ventures. 

Following his short tenure in British GT, Gottsacker began an additional part-time campaign in the Pirelli World Challenge, returning to Performance Motorsports Group. Entered into the GTSA class for the opening round at St. Pete, he scored the class victory in the second race of the weekend. In subsequent appearances in 2017, he was classified as a Pro driver, only eligible for the GTS class championship at large. Gottsacker returned to the championship at Road America, taking his first overall GTS podium at Mid-Ohio the following month. In May of that year, Gottsacker made his debut in the IMSA SportsCar Championship, pairing with Chase in a TRG-entered Porsche 911 GT3 R in the GTD class.

For 2018, Gottsacker stepped up to a full-time drive in the Pirelli World Challenge, joining Racers Edge Motorsports. The move was accompanied by a change in manufacturer, with Gottsacker piloting a GT4-homologated SIN R1, once again in the GTS class. He scored his first podium of the season at COTA in March, beginning his SprintX campaign on a high note. After a difficult round at VIR and a pair of strong finishes at Lime Rock, Gottsacker would score his first GTS victory at Portland. After taking pole for the first race of the weekend, he would win race two, holding a nine-second gap over the second-placed Panoz Avezzano of Ian James and Matt Keegan. Gottsacker added another victory in the final round of the season at Utah Motorsports Campus, but would miss out on the GTS class title by three points to James Sofronas and Alex Welch. To close his 2018 campaign, Gottsacker joined Extreme Speed Motorsports in the IMSA Prototype Challenge, finishing fourth in a one-off appearance at Road Atlanta alongside co-driver Max Hanratty. 

2019 saw Gottsacker swap manufacturers once again, joining ST Racing's BMW entry into the new GT4 America Series following the dissolution of the Pirelli World Challenge at the end of 2018. He and co-driver Jon Miller competed in the West Pro-Am sub-classification, taking the title at year's end after winning six of the ten races on the schedule. Sweeping the weekends at COTA and Las Vegas, alongside one each at Laguna Seca and Portland, the duo claimed the title by a sizable 68 points over the sister BMW of Samantha Tan and Jason Wolfe. The following season, Gottsacker paired with Nick Wittmer, entering the championship's Silver Cup class. The duo collected four race victories, with two class wins at COTA and one each at VIR and Road America, en route to a second-place points finish. The championship came down to the final race of the season, with Gottsacker and Wittmer falling six points short of champions Jarett Andretti and Colin Mullan. 

Gottsacker returned to a reduced GT4 schedule in 2021, making only a one-off appearance for ST Racing at Road America. Joining fellow Hyundai TCR driver Tyler Maxson, the duo rebounded from a difficult first race to take the Silver Cup victory in the second race of the weekend. 2022 saw Gottsacker continue his relationship with the team, joining the team's customer debut of the BMW M4 GT3 at the 24 Hours of Dubai. Later that year, Gottsacker took part in the 24 Hours of Spa and Indianapolis 8 Hours with the team, winning the Silver class in the latter as the only entrant.

In early 2022, Gottsacker made his debut at the 12 Hours of Sebring, joining Mühlner Motorsport as a late replacement for Moritz Kranz. Driving alongside Alec Udell and Ugo de Wilde, the team finished ninth in the LMP3 class following an accident.

TCR

To begin 2019, Gottsacker was contracted to drive the new-for-2019 Hyundai Veloster N TCR, serving as one of Hyundai's North America-based factory drivers for the 2019 Michelin Pilot Challenge season. Paired with Mason Filippi, the two scored three podiums and one race victory in 2019, finishing second in the championship; 23 points adrift of the sister entry. Said victory came in dramatic fashion, after a drive-time penalty dropped the race-winning HART entry to the back of the TCR classification, elevating Filippi and Gottsacker to the race victory. Gottsacker returned to the team in 2020, paired with new co-driver Mark Wilkins. Gottsacker would match his second-place result from 2019, taking two victories and four total podiums. The duo swept the two rounds at Sebring, falling 11 points short of the sister No. 33 entry of Gabby Chaves and Ryan Norman.

The following season saw Hyundai debut the Elantra N TCR, with Gottsacker continuing to pair with Wilkins, this time behind the wheel of Bryan Herta Autosport's No. 33 entry. The two claimed their only victory of the season at Laguna Seca, finishing fifth in the championship. Gottsacker returned to the team in 2022, this time in the team's No. 98 entry alongside long-time teammate Parker Chase. The two scored their first victory of the season at Mid-Ohio in May, registering two total podiums en route to a fifth-place finish in the class championship.

The team's reduction to three entries for 2023 saw Gottsacker change co-drivers, running alongside Robert Wickens. In addition, Gottsacker was also included in Hyundai North America's lineup for the 2023 Nürburgring 24 Hours, where he'd make his debut alongside fellow factory drivers Michael Lewis, Mason Filippi, and Taylor Hagler. In the months leading up to the race, Gottsacker chronicled his journey to the race in a Sportscar365 column, outlining the team's efforts in the Nürburgring Endurance Series VT2 class with the Hyundai i30 N.

Personal life
Gottsacker is an avid fisher, and received his Eagle Scout certification while in high school.

Racing record

Career summary

* Season still in progress.

Complete IMSA SportsCar Championship results
(key) (Races in bold indicate pole position)

References

External links
Harry Gottsacker at Motorsport.com

1999 births
Living people
American racing drivers
Global RallyCross Championship drivers
British GT Championship drivers
WeatherTech SportsCar Championship drivers
12 Hours of Sebring drivers
24H Series drivers
Bryan Herta Autosport drivers
Extreme Speed Motorsports drivers
Michelin Pilot Challenge drivers
Racing drivers from San Antonio
Racing drivers from Texas
Sportspeople from San Antonio